The Moth Gatherer is a post-metal band from Stockholm, Sweden, formed in 2008. The band consisted of Victor Wegeborn and Alex Stjernfeldt between 2008 and 2013.
In mid 2013, Svante Karlsson joined the band.

In April 2013 they released their debut album A Bright Celestial Light on Agonia Records, and their second album, The Earth Is The Sky was released to critical acclaim November 27, 2015.

Biography
The Moth Gatherer was founded in Stockholm in 2008 by Victor Wegeborn and Alex Stjernfeldt.
They started The Moth Gatherer as a sort of therapy, a way to deal with the loss of people they loved and the hole it left behind. The Moth Gatherer was a way for Alex and Victor to move on.
During 2009 and 2010 they explored their sound, and in mid 2010 they began recording what was to become their debut "A Bright Celestial Light". It contains 5 songs and 45-minute play time.
In April 2013 they released their debut "A Bright Celestial Light" through Agonia Records to critical acclaim. Many reviewers pointed out The Moth Gatherers evolutionary sound and atmospheric approach to songwriting.

About the name "The Moth Gatherer" Alex commented in an interview: "When you lose someone, a lot of things in your world is upside down, and it’s hard to see something positive. You also get a lot of questions about why? More or less, we fumble in darkness. Moths always searches for a source of light, like you do. So for me, the name stands for a search for hope."

On November 27, 2015, The Moth Gatherer released their second album, The Earth Is The Sky. The band choose Karl Daniel Lidén once again for mixing and mastering, notable for his work with Dozer and Switchblade. The new album features guest appearances from members of Terra Tenebrosa, Monolord, Kongh and more. The album was met with critical acclaim from magazines and fans worldwide, and ended up in many Album of The Month and Album of The Year charts.

In early 2017 they announced a new EP called The Comfortable Low featuring Dennis Lyxzén from Refused and Fred Burman from Satan Takes A Holiday. It was released worldwide on Agonia Records on March 31, 2017.

Members
 Victor Wegeborn – vocals, guitar, programming
 Svante Karlsson – drums 2014–present
 Ronny Westphal – guitar 2015–present
 Henrik Ekholm – bass 2022–present

Previous members
 Alex Stjernfeldt – vocals, bass 2008–2018
 Dan Hemgren – bass 2018–2021

Discography
A Bright Celestial Light (Album, April 16, 2013)
The Earth Is The Sky (Album, November 27, 2015)
The Comfortable Low (EP, March 31, 2017)
Esoteric Oppression (Album, February 22, 2019)

References

Sludge metal musical groups
Swedish post-rock groups
Musical groups from Stockholm